The Mackay Wanderers are a football (soccer) club from Mackay, North Queensland, Australia, and are registered within Mackay Regional Football of Football Queensland. Mackay Wanderers was established in 1923.

References

External links
 Mackay Wanderers web page
 Skills built Arsenal way
 Wanderers face up to title favourites
 Wanderers book final shot at Lions
 Wanderers kick goals with new clubrooms
 Lorimer voted man of the match
 Call to Arms

Association football clubs established in 1923
Soccer clubs in Queensland
1923 establishments in Australia